William Edward Boeing Jr. (November 22, 1922 – January 8, 2015) was an American real estate developer and philanthropist who was the son of aviation pioneer William E. Boeing, founder of the Boeing Company. In 2010, the American Institute of Aeronautics and Astronautics presented Boeing Jr. with a certificate of achievement for his commitment to education and the preservation of air and space history.

Boeing Jr. had fond childhood memories of the Red Barn, the birthplace of the Boeing Company, where he was once given a piece of balsa wood he crafted into a model ship. He did not understand his father's importance until his classmates nicknamed him after one of the Boeing airplanes. In the late 1970s he was instrumental in ensuring that the Red Barn, the oldest airplane manufacturing facility in the U.S., was preserved and integrated into the Seattle Museum of Flight. He died in Seattle on January 8, 2015, aged 92.

In 2014, Boeing Jr. was inducted into the International Air & Space Hall of Fame at the San Diego Air & Space Museum.

References

1922 births
2015 deaths
American real estate businesspeople
American people of German descent

20th-century American businesspeople